Sidh may refer to:

 Sidh, Gujrat, a village in the Gujrat District of Pakistan
 Sidh community, a caste in western Rajasthan.
 Sidh, the abodes of the Aos Sí in Celtic mythology
 Supersingular Isogeny Diffie–Hellman Key Exchange, post-quantum public key cryptographic algorithm; see Supersingular isogeny key exchange